Sand Canyon, California  may refer to:
Sand Canyon, Kern County, California
Sand Canyon, Los Angeles County, California